Human Chain (2010) is the twelfth and final poetry collection by Seamus Heaney. It won the Forward Poetry Prize Best Collection 2010 award and the Irish Times Poetry Now Award for 2011, this was Heaney's second Poetry Now Award, having previously won in 2007 for District and Circle. It was also shortlisted for the 2011 Griffin Poetry Prize.

Contents 

 "Had I not been awake"
 Album
 The Conway Stewart
 Uncoupled
 The Butts
 Chanson d'Aventure
 Miracle
 Human Chain
 A Mite-Box
 An Old Refrain
 The Wood Road
 The Baler
 Derry Derry Down
 Eelworks
 Slack
 A Herbal
 Canopy
 The Riverbank Field
 Route 110
 Death of a Painter
 Loughanure
 Wraiths
 Sweeney Out-takes
 Colum Cille Cecinit
 Hermit Songs
 "Lick the pencil"
 "The door was open and the house was dark"
 In the Attic
 A Kite for Aibhín

Reception
Colm Tóibín of The Guardian called it Heaney's ″ best single volume for many years″ and ″one that contains some of the best poems he has written″. He further writes ″Heaney allows this struggle between the lacrimae rerum and the consolations of poetry to have a force which is satisfying because its result is so tentative and uncertain. Memory here can be filled with tones of regret and even undertones of anguish, but it also can appear with a sense of hard-won wonder. There is an active urge to capture the living breath of things, but he also allows sorrow into his poems.″ Kate Kellaway of The Observer wrote ″Human Chain is about inheritance – in the fullest sense of the word. If it were a poet such as Philip Larkin writing, human chain would mean "man hands on misery to man". But what makes Seamus Heaney's writing so fortifying is, partly, his temperament: his human chain is tolerant, durable, compassionate and every link is reinforced by literature.″
 Luke Smith of Oxonian Review wrote ″Heaney is now 71, and Human Chain is his first book since the stroke. It should not surprise us, then, that the poems here concern themselves with mortality, itself so finely expressed in the title poem, where the comparison is drawn to the moment of release in slinging sacks of grain onto a trailer.″

Irish Poet Eamon Grennan in his review for The Irish Times, wrote ″As always, of course, it’s his [Heaney] language, as it translates the world into a world of words, that is a continuous instruction and delight, its colloquial ease given heft by its unabashed rootedness in the eloquence of literature – which is here, as it has always been, a field he paces with the same alert poise with which he might scan the intimate acres of Bellaghy or Glanmore.″

References

External links
Seamus Heaney on NobelPrize.org

2010 poetry books
Irish poetry collections
Poetry by Seamus Heaney
Faber and Faber books